Genaside II was a British electronic group active in the 1990s and early 2000s. Their music started as rave, developing into jungle, breakbeat and big beat. Its main member was Kris Ogden, though some other members went on to form the band Archive.

Their 1991 song "Narra Mine" provided a sample for The Prodigy 1996 track Firestarter. Several years before, another The Prodigy track, Jericho, was remixed by Genaside II.

Albums
New Life 4 The Hunted (1996)
Ad Finité (1999)
Return Of The Redline Evangelist (2002)

References

External links
Kris Ogden's Myspace page

British electronic music groups